Irina Molicheva (born ) is a Russian female  track cyclist. She competed in the team pursuit event at the 2014 UCI Track Cycling World Championships.

References

External links
 Profile at cyclingarchives.com

1988 births
Living people
Russian track cyclists
Russian female cyclists
Place of birth missing (living people)
Cyclists from Moscow